"Light of the World (Sing Hallelujah)" is a song by We the Kingdom that was released as a standalone single, on October 30, 2020. The song was written by Andrew Bergthold, Ed Cash, Franni Cash, Martin Cash, and Scott Cash.

"Light of the World (Sing Hallelujah)" peaked at No. 29 on the US Hot Christian Songs chart.

Background
On October 30, 2020, We the Kingdom released "Light of the World (Sing Hallelujah)" accompanied by an audio video of the song. Ed Cash shared the message of the song, saying:

Composition
The singers' vocal range spans from F♯3 to C♯5.

Commercial performance
"Light of the World (Sing Hallelujah)" made its debut at No. 39 on the US Hot Christian Songs chart dated December 12, 2020, following its commercial release. It went on to peak at number 29 on the chart, and spent a total of four consecutive weeks on Hot Christian Songs Chart.

Music videos
The official audio video of "Light of the World (Sing Hallelujah)" was published on We the Kingdom's YouTube channel on October 30, 2020. We the Kingdom released the lyric video of the song on November 20, 2020. The acoustic performance video of the song was released on December 8, 2020, on YouTube.

Credits
Adapted from AllMusic.
 Jesse Brock — mixing assistant
 Warren David — mixing assistant
 Joe LaPorta — mastering engineer
 Sean Moffitt — mixing
 We the Kingdom — primary artist, producer

Charts

Release history

References

External links
  on PraiseCharts

2020 songs
2020 singles
We the Kingdom songs
Songs written by Ed Cash